The George Jr. and Sarah Morgan House, also known as the Olde Stone House, is a historic Georgian style house located at 208 Egg Harbor Road in Washington Township in Gloucester County, New Jersey, United States. Built , it was added to the National Register of Historic Places on April 8, 2019, for its significance in architecture.

History and description
The two-story vernacular Georgian style house features a coursed ashlar façade using local ironstone. According to the nomination form, the house was earlier thought to have been built by George Morgan Sr. .

Museum and historic village
In December, fire caused serious damage to the house. The Washington Township Historical Society restored it by 1986. The house is now a historic house museum operated by the Washington Township Historic Preservation Commission. Four other historic buildings from the township have been moved here to form the Olde Stone House Historic Village. They are the Turnersville Post Office (1864), the Bunker Hill Presbyterian Church (1869), the Charles Quay Farmhouse (1825), and the Blackwood Railroad Station (1891).

See also
National Register of Historic Places listings in Gloucester County, New Jersey
List of the oldest buildings in New Jersey
List of museums in New Jersey

References

External links
 

Washington Township, Gloucester County, New Jersey
Stone houses in New Jersey
Georgian architecture in New Jersey
1765 establishments in New Jersey
Houses completed in 1765
Historic house museums in New Jersey
Houses on the National Register of Historic Places in New Jersey
Houses in Gloucester County, New Jersey
National Register of Historic Places in Gloucester County, New Jersey
New Jersey Register of Historic Places
Museums in Gloucester County, New Jersey